James Buckley-Thorp (born 1989) is a British entrepreneur from Somerset, United Kingdom.

Early life and education
James Buckley-Thorp was born in April 1989 in Bath, Somerset, United Kingdom as Tom Anthony James Buckley-Thorp. He did his schooling at Clayton Hall Academy in Staffordshire and graduated in law from the University of Kent in Canterbury, UK.

Career
James founded the international clothing brand Rupert and Buckley in 2011 and opened its first shop in Bath, Somerset followed by another new store in the city centre of Oxford in 2016. In 2016, James exited and sold Rupert and Buckley. He then moved to San Francisco for one year.

In 2018, he moved to London, where he subsequently founded his second business, Bequest which is a fintech life insurance company based in London.

Bibliography

References

Living people
1989 births
People from Bath, Somerset
British businesspeople
21st-century British businesspeople
Alumni of the University of Kent